Kleinsee Airport or Kleinzee Airport  is an airport serving Kleinzee (also spelled Kleinsee), a town in the Northern Cape province in South Africa.

Facilities

References

Airports in South Africa
Transport in the Northern Cape
Buildings and structures in the Northern Cape
Namakwa District Municipality